Nirmala College of Engineering is a private engineering college situated in Kunnappilly, Thrissur district of Kerala, India. The college is affiliated to APJ Abdul Kalam Technological University and University of Calicut.

Departments
 Civil Engineering
 Computer Science Engineering
 Automobile Engineering
 Applied Science department
 Mechatronics Engineering
 Mechanical Engineering

References

External links
 

Engineering colleges in Thrissur district
All India Council for Technical Education
Colleges affiliated with the University of Calicut